Ilya Uralovich Gilyazutdinov (born 8 January 1998) is a Russian football player.

Club career
He made his debut in the Russian Professional Football League for FC Irtysh Omsk on 14 August 2019 in a game against FC Zenit Irkutsk.

References

External links
 
 Profile by Russian Professional Football League
 
 

1998 births
People from Syzransky District
Living people
Russian footballers
Association football midfielders
FC Rubin Kazan players
FC Sellier & Bellot Vlašim players
FC Irtysh Omsk players
Czech National Football League players
Russian expatriate footballers
Expatriate footballers in the Czech Republic
FC Volga Ulyanovsk players
Sportspeople from Samara Oblast